The triathlon competitions at the 2016 Summer Olympics in Rio de Janeiro took place from 18 to 20 August 2016 at Fort Copacabana. Fifty-five athletes competed in each of the men's and women's events.

Format

The Olympic triathlon contained three components; a  swim,  cycle, and a  run. The competitions took the form of a single event between all competitors with no heats.

Qualification

The qualification period was from 20 May 2014 to 15 May 2016. A total of 110 athletes (55 for each gender) vied for the coveted spots with a maximum of three sent to compete for the first eight National Olympic Committees (NOCs), while the other NOCs might have a maximum of two per event. To qualify for the Games, all athletes must earn a quota place through the Continental Qualification Events, achieve a top three finish through the World Qualification Event and be among the top 140 in the Olympic Qualification List, World Triathlon Series Ranking, and Points List.

Thirty-nine athletes for each gender qualified through the ranking, next to the 5 continental champions and the top 3 in the International Qualifying Event, held in Rio de Janeiro on 1–2 August 2015. Host nation Brazil had reserved one quota per gender, while two more were allocated according to the Tripartite Commission Invitation. In the end, further five places were distributed to the NOCs without any quota through the ITU Points List.

Schedule
All times are Time in Brazil (UTC-3).

Participating

Participating nations

Medal summary

Medal table

Events

See also
Paratriathlon at the 2016 Summer Paralympics

References

External links 

 
 
 Results Book – Triathlon
Media Guide

 
2016 Summer Olympics events
O
Triathlon at the Summer Olympics
Triathlon competitions in Brazil